Glenburnie is a community in, and the county seat of, Frontenac County, Ontario.

Neighbourhoods in Kingston, Ontario